H. C. Ogden House, also known as the Wise-Ogden House, is a historic home located at Wheeling, Ohio County, West Virginia. It was built in 1893, and is a -story, T-shaped, Queen Anne-style frame dwelling.  It features a deep, full-width front porch with Doric order columns, a round tower with domed roof, and coursed wood shingles.  The house has 5 bedrooms, 4 bathrooms, 1 half-bath, 1 kitchen, and 9 additional rooms.  The house was built for Herschel Coombs Ogden (1869-1943), a publisher, community leader, and businessman significant in the history of West Virginia.

It was listed on the National Register of Historic Places in 1990.  It is located in the Woodsdale-Edgewood Neighborhood Historic District.

References

Houses in Wheeling, West Virginia
Houses on the National Register of Historic Places in West Virginia
Queen Anne architecture in West Virginia
Houses completed in 1893
National Register of Historic Places in Wheeling, West Virginia
Individually listed contributing properties to historic districts on the National Register in West Virginia